Albert Vladimirovich Andreyev (born April 8, 1968) is a retired Russian professional footballer.

He made his professional debut in the Soviet Second League in 1988 for FC Uralmash Sverdlovsk.

References

1968 births
Sportspeople from Izhevsk
Living people
Soviet footballers
Russian footballers
Russian Premier League players
FC Ural Yekaterinburg players
FC Izhevsk players
Association football midfielders